The 1988 William & Mary Tribe football team represented the College of William & Mary as an independent during the 1988 NCAA Division I-AA football season. Led by Jimmye Laycock in his ninth year as head coach, William & Mary finished the season with a record of 6–4–1.

Schedule

References

William and Mary
William & Mary Tribe football seasons
William and Mary Indians football